The boys' 50 metre butterfly event at the 2010 Youth Olympic Games took place on August 18–19, at the Singapore Sports School.

Medalists

Heats

Heat 1

Heat 2

Heat 3

Semifinals

Semifinal 1

Semifinal 2

Final

References
 Heat Results
 Semifinals Results
 Final Result

Swimming at the 2010 Summer Youth Olympics
Men's 50 metre butterfly